Abutilon sachetianum is a small tree only known from the Marquesas.  The species is found in small subpopulations on the islands of Eiao, Hatutaa, Hiva Oa, Mohotani and Nuku Hiva.  Populations on Eiao and Hatutaa are in a critically endangered state.

References

sachetianum
Flora of the Marquesas Islands
Vulnerable plants